Paul Lewis (born March 3, 1999) is an American soccer player who currently plays for USL Championship side Charleston Battery.

Career

Youth
Lewis featured for a number of academy clubs including Seattle Sounders FC Academy and Crossfire Academy. Lewis Graduated from Eastside Catholic School in 2016, where he was a two-time All-League player and was named as the teams Most Inspirational Player in 2015.

College & USL League Two
In 2016, Lewis attended Loyola Marymount University, where he attended for three years, making four appearances for the Lions, all in the 2017 season. In 2019, Lewis transferred to California State University, Northridge, going on to appear thirteen times in his senior year.

In 2019, Lewis also played with USL League Two side FC Golden State Force, appearing five times in the regular season.

Professional
On March 5, 2020, Lewis signed with USL Championship side Charleston Battery. On September 10, 2020, Lewis joined USL League One side South Georgia Tormenta on loan for the remainder of the season, but didn't appear for the club.

He made his professional debut on August 6, 2021, starting in a 3–2 loss to Pittsburgh Riverhounds.

References

1999 births
Living people
American soccer players
Association football goalkeepers
Loyola Marymount Lions men's soccer players
Cal State Northridge Matadors men's soccer players
FC Golden State Force players
Charleston Battery players
Tormenta FC players
Sportspeople from Bellevue, Washington
Soccer players from Washington (state)
USL Championship players
USL League Two players